Serhiy Oleksandrovych Dmytriyev (born 3 November 1978) is a former Ukrainian football player.

References

1978 births
Living people
Ukrainian footballers
FC Shakhtar-2 Donetsk players
FC Metalurh Donetsk players
Ukrainian Premier League players
FC Anzhi Makhachkala players
Russian Premier League players
Ukrainian expatriate footballers
Expatriate footballers in Russia
FC SKA-Khabarovsk players
FC Kryvbas Kryvyi Rih players
FC Olimpik Donetsk players
FC Zorya Luhansk players

Association football defenders